The 2007 Troy Trojans football team represented Troy University as a member of the Sun Belt Conference during the 2007 NCAA Division I FBS football season. Led by 17th-year head coach Larry Blakeney, the Trojans compiled an overall record of 8–4 with a mark of 6–1 in conference play, sharing the Sun Belt title with Florida Atlantic. This was the second consecutive season in which Troy captured a share of the conference title. The team played home games at Movie Gallery Stadium in Troy, Alabama.

Schedule

Rankings

Coaching staff
 Larry Blakeney – Head Coach
 Shayne Wasden – Assistant Head Coach
 Tony Franklin – Offensive Coordinator/Quarterbacks
 Jeremy Rowell – Defensive Coordinator/Secondary
 Randy Butler – Defensive Ends/Recruiting Coordinator
 Maurea Crain – Defensive Line
 Neal Brown – Inside Receivers
 Benjy Parker – Linebackers
 John Schlarman – Offensive Line
 Chad Scott – Running Backs
 Richard Shaughnessy – Strength and Conditioning

References

Troy Trojans
Troy Trojans football seasons
Sun Belt Conference football champion seasons
Troy Trojans football